Salwa al-Raf'i (born 1942) is an Egyptian novelist and screenwriter.

Al-Raf'i received her bachelor's degree in 1967 from the Institute of Dramatic Arts; in 1989 she received another, in screenwriting, from the Film Institute. Some of her work has been translated into French. She has published several novels and screenplays for films and television.

References

1942 births
Living people
Egyptian screenwriters
Egyptian novelists
Women screenwriters
Women television writers
20th-century novelists
20th-century Egyptian women writers
20th-century Egyptian writers
21st-century novelists
21st-century Egyptian women writers
21st-century Egyptian writers